Emily Nishikawa (born July 26, 1989) is a Canadian former cross-country skier.

Born in Whitehorse, Yukon, Canada, Nishikawa competed at the 2014 Winter Olympics in Sochi, where she finished in 42nd in the 15k skiathlon, and in the 2018 Winter Olympics in Pyeongchang where she finished 44th in the same event. After the end of the 2019–20 World Cup season, Nishikawa announced her retirement from international skiing.

Cross-country skiing results
All results are sourced from the International Ski Federation (FIS).

Olympic Games

World Championships

World Cup

Season standings

References

External links

1989 births
Living people
Sportspeople from Whitehorse
Canadian sportspeople of Japanese descent
Canadian female cross-country skiers
Cross-country skiers at the 2014 Winter Olympics
Cross-country skiers at the 2018 Winter Olympics
Olympic cross-country skiers of Canada
Tour de Ski skiers
21st-century Canadian women